Dašice is a town in Pardubice District in the Pardubice Region of the Czech Republic. It has about 2,300 inhabitants. The town centre is well preserved and is protected by law as an urban monument zone.

Administrative parts

Villages of Malolánské, Prachovice, Velkolánské and Zminný are administrative parts of Dašice.

Geography
It lies in a flat landscape of the East Elbe Table lowland, on the edge of the Polabí region. The river Loučná flows through the town.

History
The first written mention of Dašice is from 1318. In 1437, Dašice was first referred to as a market town. In 1517, Dašice estate was acquired by the Pernštejn family and was merged with Pardubice estate. In 1917, Dašice was promoted to a town.

Sights
The historic centre is formed by the large T. G. Masaryka Square with preserved burgher houses from the turn of the 18th–19th century, characterized by late Rococo Empire facades.

One of the landmarks is the Church of the Nativity of the Virgin Mary. It is a Baroque basilica from 1677–1707.

The historical and technical monument is the Neo-Renaissance building of the water mill, in which two Francis turbines have been working non-stop since 1922.

References

External links

Virtual show

Cities and towns in the Czech Republic
Populated places in Pardubice District